Dirck Vellert (1480, Amsterdam – 1547, Antwerp), was a Flemish Renaissance painter.

Biography
According to the RKD he was a draughtsman, glass painter and engraver who made small devotional prints to put in albums. He was a member of the Antwerp Guild of St. Luke in 1511 and served as deacon in 1518 and 1526. He signed works "DV" and with a star.

References

Dirck Vellert on Artnet

1480 births
1547 deaths
Flemish Renaissance painters
Artists from Amsterdam
Painters from Antwerp